

Highest-grossing films

List of films
A list of films released in Japan in 2004 (see 2004 in film).

See also
2004 in Japan
2004 in Japanese television

Footnotes

Bibliography

External links
Japanese films of 2004 at the Internet Movie Database

2004
Japanese
Films